Saulius Kulvietis (born February 14, 1991) is a Lithuanian professional basketball player for ONVO Büyükçekmece of the Turkish Basketball Super League (BSL).

Professional career
On July 29, 2018, Kulvietis signed a one-year contract with Lietkabelis Panevėžys.

Kulvietis spent the 2019–20 season with JDA Dijon of the LNB Pro A, averaging 7.3 points per game.

On July 27, 2020, Kulvietis signed with BC Rytas Vilnius. On October 15, 2020, he left the team on a mutual agreement after not being able to play.

On April 1, 2021, Kulvietis signed with MoraBanc Andorra of the Liga ACB until the end of the 2021–2022 season.

On September 8, 2021, Kulvietis signed a one-year deal with Telekom Baskets Bonn of the Basketball Bundesliga (BBL).

On August 6, 2022, Kulvietis signed with Büyükçekmece of the Turkish Basketball Super League (BSL).

References

External links
 Saulius Kulvietis at eurobasket.com
 Saulius Kulvietis at RealGM.com

1991 births
Living people
Basketball players from Kaunas
BC Andorra players
Expatriate basketball people in Andorra
BC Juventus players
BC Lietkabelis players
BC Pieno žvaigždės players
BC Prienai players
BK VEF Rīga players
Büyükçekmece Basketbol players
JDA Dijon Basket players
Joventut Badalona players
Liga ACB players
Lithuanian expatriate basketball people in France
Lithuanian expatriate basketball people in Germany
Lithuanian expatriate basketball people in Latvia
Lithuanian expatriate basketball people in Spain
Lithuanian expatriate basketball people in Turkey
Lithuanian men's basketball players
Power forwards (basketball)
Small forwards
Telekom Baskets Bonn players